Liu Wenjun (born 5 May 1995) is a Paralympian athlete from China competing mainly in category T54 wheelchair sprint and middle-distance events.

Wenjun competed in the 2008 Summer Paralympics in Beijing, China.  There she won a gold medal in the women's 4 x 100 metre relay - T53/54 event, a silver medal in the women's 100 metres - T54 event, finished seventh in the women's 800 metres - T54 event and finished sixth in the women's Marathon - T54 event. Four years later she won gold again, winning the 100m sprint at the 2012 Summer Paralympics in London.

Wenjun took two gold medals in the 100m (T54) and  relay (T53/54) events at the 2016 Summer Paralympics in Rio.

References

External links
 

Paralympic athletes of China
Paralympic gold medalists for China
Paralympic silver medalists for China
1995 births
Living people
World record holders in Paralympic athletics
Medalists at the 2008 Summer Paralympics
Medalists at the 2012 Summer Paralympics
Medalists at the 2016 Summer Paralympics
Athletes (track and field) at the 2008 Summer Paralympics
Athletes (track and field) at the 2012 Summer Paralympics
Athletes (track and field) at the 2016 Summer Paralympics
Paralympic medalists in athletics (track and field)
20th-century Chinese women
21st-century Chinese women